The Men's 200m athletics events for the 2016 Summer Paralympics take place at the Estádio Olímpico João Havelange from September 8 to September 16, 2016. A total of 15 events were contested over this distance for 19 different classifications.

Schedule

Medal summary

Results

The following were the results of the finals of each of the Men's 200 metres events in each of the classifications. Further details of each event are available on that event's dedicated page.

T11

17:51 15 September 2016:

T12

19:03 17 September 2016:

T35

10:50 12 September 2016:

T42

19:08 11 September 2016:

T44

19:21 12 September 2016:

References

Athletics at the 2016 Summer Paralympics
2016 in men's athletics